The 2020 Chengdu Hunters season was the second season of Chengdu Hunters's existence in the Overwatch League and the team's first without head coach Wang "RUI" Xingrui. The Hunters planned to host two back-to-back homestand weekends at the Wuliangye Chengdu Performing Arts Centre, but all homestand events were canceled due to the COVID-19 pandemic.

Preceding offseason

Organizational changes 
On November 16, head coach Wang "RUI" Xingrui announced that he would be stepping down from his position due to health issues. On January 14, the team announced that Hunters' assistant coach Chang "Ray" Chia-Hua and LGE.Huya head coach Wu "Dokkaebi" Xiuqing would serve as the Hunters' co-head coaches. Additionally, former Hunters support player Li "Garry" Guan was added as an assistant coach.

Roster changes 
The Hunters enter the new season with all ten of their players under contract. The OWL's deadline to exercise a team option is November 11, after which any players not retained will become a free agent. Free agency officially began on October 7.

The Hunters' first offseason change was announced on December 27 with the departures of DPS Zhihao "YangXiaoLong" Zhang and main tank Yansong "Jiqiren" Wei. On January 14, the Hunters revealed the signing of main tank player Chen "ATing" Shao-Hua and promotions of support players He "Molly" Chengzhi and Chen "Lengsa" Jingyi from their academy team LGE.Huya.

Roster

Standings

Game log

Regular season

Midseason tournaments 

| style="text-align:center;" | Bonus wins awarded: 1

Postseason

References 

Chengdu Hunters
Chengdu Hunters
Chengdu Hunters seasons